The 1906–07 Dartmouth men's ice hockey season was the 2nd season of play for the program.

Season
After a brief debut in 1906, Dartmouth's ice hockey team played a fuller schedule in their second campaign. The Greens played most of their games on the road but that didn't stop them from posting their first winning record.

Note: Dartmouth College did not possess a moniker for its athletic teams until the 1920s, however, the university had adopted 'Dartmouth Green' as its school color in 1866.

Roster

Standings

Schedule and Results

|-
!colspan=12 style=";" | Regular Season

References

Dartmouth Big Green men's ice hockey seasons
Dartmouth
Dartmouth
Dartmouth
Dartmouth